Jonathan Meakins may refer to:
 Jonathan Larmonth Meakins (born 1941), Canadian expert in immunobiology and surgical infections
 Jonathan Campbell Meakins (1882–1959), Canadian doctor